Jehad Thakri (born 21 July 2001) is a Saudi Arabian footballer who plays as a defender for Al-Qadsiah.

Career
Thakri started his career at the youth teams of Al-Qadsiah. On 5 November 2020, Thakri signed his first professional contract with Al-Qadsiah. He made his first-team debut on 23 February 2021 in the league match against Al-Batin.

References

External links
 
 

Living people
2001 births
People from Khobar
Association football defenders
Saudi Arabian footballers
Saudi Arabia youth international footballers
Al-Qadsiah FC players
Saudi Professional League players
Saudi First Division League players